Padež is a village in the municipality of Leskovac, Serbia. According to the 2002 census, the village has a population of 58 people.

References

Populated places in Jablanica District